Ian Wilkinson (born 14 April 1979) is a British racing cyclist from England, who currently rides for British amateur team Spartans Velo Club. A prolific rider, he competes at the top level in cross country and marathon mountain bike racing, cyclo-cross, circuit and road racing. He is a multiple national champion, winning championships as a junior, under 23 and senior rider. He has represented Great Britain at many international events such as World Championships and World Cups in several disciplines. Outside of cycling, Wilkinson's occupation is as a builder.

Career
From Barnoldswick in Lancashire, Wilkinson was a member of British Cycling's World Class Performance Plan between 1999 and 2001. He then went to France to ride on the road for a year before returning to Great Britain to ride for ScienceinSport.com, followed by stints riding for Giant RT and Science in Sport/Trek.

In 2010, Wilkinson joined , remaining with the squad for three seasons before joining  in 2013. He was announced as part of the  squad for 2014.

Major results

2000
 1st  Cross-country, National Under-23 Mountain Bike Championships
 6th Cross-country, UEC European Under-23 Mountain Bike Championships
2005
 3rd Marathon, National Mountain Bike Championships
2006
 1st Ellis Briggs Grand Prix
 2nd Overall National Cross-country Points Series
2nd Round 1, Sherwood
2nd Round 3, Drumlanrig
3rd Round 4, Newnham Park
7th Round 2, Margam Country Park
 5th Overall National Circuit Race Series
2nd Clitheroe Grand Prix
3rd Otley Grand Prix
3rd Colne Grand Prix
3rd Travelwise Warwick Town Centre Circuit Races
4th Beverley Town Centre Circuit Races
6th Rochdale Grand Prix
 8th National Criterium Championships
 8th Cross-country, National Mountain Bike Championships
 8th Overall Premier Calendar
6th Girvan 3 Day
7th Lincoln Grand Prix
2007
 1st Overall Girvan 3 Day
1st Stage 3
 National Cross-Country Series
1st Sherwood
4th Margam Park
 1st Roger Martin Memorial Road Race
 2nd Cross-country, National Mountain Bike Championships
 2nd East Midlands International CiCLE Classic
 3rd Overall Bikeline 2 Day
 4th Rochdale Grand Prix
 5th Cheltenham, National Cyclo-cross Trophy
 7th Lincoln Grand Prix
 7th Blackpool Grand Prix
 7th Colne Grand Prix
 10th Ryedale Grand Prix
2008
 National Mountain Bike Championships
1st  Marathon cross-country
3rd Cross-country
 1st Colne Grand Prix Elite Circuit Race
 1st Salford Nocturne
 1st Preston City Centre Criterium
 2nd Travelwise Warwick Town Centre Circuit Races
 5th National Criterium Championships
 6th National Cyclo-cross Championships
 7th Overall Bikeline 2 Day
1st Stages 1 & 3
 8th Overall Girvan 3 Day
 9th East Midlands International CiCLE Classic
2009
 1st Rutland–Melton CiCLE Classic
 1st Warwick Town Centre Race
 1st Newcastle Leazes Criterium
 2nd Chas Messenger Trophy Road Race
 2nd Lincoln Grand Prix
 3rd Rochdale Grand Prix Circuit Race
 4th Overall Girvan 3-Day Road Race
 4th Eddie Soens Memorial Road Race
 4th Beaumont Trophy
 5th Overall Rás Tailteann
1st Stage 2
 6th Blackpool Nocturne
 7th East Yorkshire Classic Circuit Race
 8th Blackburn Grand Prix
2010
 1st Overall National Circuit Series
1st Dumfries Bike Fest Circuit Race
2nd Colne Grand Prix
 1st Newport Nocturne
 2nd National Criterium Championships
 2nd Tour of the Reservoir
2011
 3rd East Yorkshire Classic
 4th Tour de Mumbai II
 4th Clayton Velo Classic
 6th Tour de Mumbai I
 9th Smithfield Nocturne
2012
 1st Stage 3 Tour de Normandie
 2nd Beverbeek Classic
 2nd Newport Nocturne
 3rd Overall Baltic Chain Tour
 6th Grand Prix Impanis-Van Petegem
2013
 1st Rutland–Melton CiCLE Classic
 1st Stockton Grand Prix
 3rd National Criterium Championships
 5th Perfs Pedal Race
 6th Colne Grand Prix
2014
 1st Eddie Soens Memorial
 4th Newport Nocturne
 6th Leicester Castle Classic
2015
 3rd Eddie Soens Memorial
 5th Rutland–Melton CiCLE Classic
 10th Milk Race
 10th Leicester Castle Classic
2016
 3rd Clayton Spring Classic
 5th Jim Rogers Memorial Road Race

References

External links

SIS – Trek results 2006–2008

1979 births
Living people
English male cyclists
Cross-country mountain bikers
Marathon mountain bikers
People from Barnoldswick
Cyclists from Yorkshire